Wartberg  is a mountain of Schwalm-Eder-Kreis, Hesse, Germany.

Mountains of Hesse